Helena Bešović (born 28 August 1984) is a Bosnian former tennis player and current head coach of the University of Houston women's tennis team.

During her career, she won three doubles titles on the ITF Circuit, and reached best WTA rankings of 733 in singles and 631 in doubles.

Playing for Bosnia and Herzegovina in Fed Cup competitions, Bešović has a win–loss record of 5–3.

ITF Circuit finals

Singles (0–3)

Doubles (3–1)

Fed Cup participation

Singles (3–0)

Doubles (2–3)

References

Helena Besovic – Tennis Coach

External links
 
 
 

1984 births
Living people
Bosnia and Herzegovina female tennis players
People from Bihać
Houston Cougars coaches
College tennis coaches in the United States